Ella Wiebe is a member of the Football Ferns, the New Zealand women's association football team.

Wiebe, born in Germany but now a naturalised New Zealander, made her senior international debut for New Zealand as a substitute in a friendly against Japan on 14 November 2009.

References

Living people
New Zealand women's international footballers
New Zealand women's association footballers
German emigrants to New Zealand
1978 births
Women's association football forwards